Rich Brightman (born April 17, 1990) is an American singer-songwriter. He was born in Bay Shore, New York and raised on Long Island. Rich started writing songs on guitar in his childhood bedroom on Long Island before after dropping on music theory classes at Bay Shore High School and started to learn audio and mix engineering the school's recording studio during study hall, lunch, and his after school hours.

Rich's mother, Sherry Brightman, gifted him a MacBook Pro for his high school graduation. Rich saved his high school graduation money along with his summer job earnings to buy studio equipment of his own to start work on his debut self-titled album. Rich released his first single "Lighter Than Air" on August 7, 2009 later releasing his first full self-titled album Rich Brightman on July 23, 2010. Rich attended Salve Regina University while writing his second album "II" released November 29, 2013 featuring rock alternative/pop tracks. During 2014–2016 Rich worked on his third release "III" which was released on Christmas Eve 2016

Discography

Rich Brightman 
 Introduction
 Casablanca
 Lighter Than Air
 Hit The Lights
 Beautiful Night
 Montauk
 You & Other Drugs
 Love Letter
 Summer
Source:

II 
 Aura
 Spark
 Drive
 Anchor
 Flight
 Posie
 Cozumel
 Blur
Source:

III 
 FLESH 4 FLESH
 HIT LIST
 RUN
 WALDEINSAMKEIT
 LATE NIGHTS
 FIRST SIGHT
 IKTSUARPOK
 ONCE MORE
 MONO NO AWARE
Source:

References

American male singer-songwriters
Singer-songwriters from New York (state)
1990 births
Living people
21st-century American male singers
21st-century American singers
Bay Shore High School alumni